Michael Stone may refer to:

 Michael Stone (American football) (born 1978), safety for the Houston Texans
 Michael Stone (Australian Army officer), Australian Army officer
 Michael Stone (author) (born 1966), English author
 Michael Stone (cyclist) (born 1991), American cyclist
 Michael Stone (Hustle), a character from the UK television series Hustle
 Michael Stone (ice hockey) (born 1990), Canadian ice hockey player
 Michael Stone (loyalist) (born 1955), loyalist paramilitary from Northern Ireland
 Michael Stone (criminal) (born 1960), English convicted murderer and suspected serial killer
 Michael H. Stone, American psychiatrist 
 Michael Stone, the nom de guerre of the American and later Israeli military officer Mickey Marcus, David "Mickey" Marcus
 Michael Jenifer Stone (1747–1812), U.S. politician
 Michael P. W. Stone (1925–1995), former Secretary of the U.S. Army
 Michael E. Stone (born 1938), scholar of Armenian studies
 Mick Stone, Australian rugby league referee

See also
 Mike Stone (disambiguation)